Łukasz Maliszewski (born 27 April 1985) is a Polish footballer who plays as a midfielder for Stilon Gorzów Wielkopolski.

External links
 

1985 births
Living people
Sportspeople from Warmian-Masurian Voivodeship
People from Kętrzyn
Association football midfielders
Polish footballers
Korona Kielce players
Polonia Bytom players
Stilon Gorzów Wielkopolski players
Ekstraklasa players
I liga players
II liga players
III liga players
IV liga players